The 2009 Morocco Tennis Tour – Meknes was a professional tennis tournament played on outdoor clay courts. It was part of the 2009 ATP Challenger Tour. It took place in Meknes, Morocco between 23 and 29 February 2009.

Singles main draw entrants

Seeds

 Rankings are as of February 16, 2009.

Other entrants
The following players received wildcards into the singles main draw:
  Rabie Chaki
  Reda El Amrani
  Anas Fattar
  Yassine Idmbarek

The following players received entry from the qualifying draw:
  Sergio Gutiérrez-Ferrol
  Leandro Migani
  Lamine Ouahab
  Albert Ramos-Viñolas

Champions

Men's singles

 Rui Machado def.  David Marrero, 6–2, 6–7(6), 6–3

Men's doubles

 Marc López /  Lamine Ouahab def.  Alessio di Mauro /  Giancarlo Petrazzuolo, 6–3, 7–5

External links
 

2009
Meknes